Goutam Smriti Satpati Binapani Vidyamandir is a high school established on 1944 at Satpati in Paschim Midnapore [1].   Students enter in this school for the Madhyamik and the Higher Secondary examinations. The school has 47 teachers and 1400 students.

School Index No-L1-085, H.S Code No-205196, Vocational Code-3568

References

1944 establishments in India
Schools in Paschim Medinipur district
Educational institutions established in 1944
High schools and secondary schools in West Bengal